"Always Where I Need to Be" is a song by British rock band the Kooks, featured on their second studio album, Konk (2008). It was released on 31 March 2008, and debuted at number 71 in the UK Singles Chart the day before via download sales alone. It jumped to its peak at number three the following week, giving the band their highest-charting single in the UK. The video shows the band members playing their instruments in various parts of New York City, including Central Park and Coney Island.

Track listings

UK CD1
 "Always Where I Need to Be"
 "Always Where I Need to Be" (video)

UK CD2
 "Always Where I Need to Be"
 "Walk Away"
 "Always Free"

UK 7-inch single
A. "Always Where I Need to Be"
B. "Mrs. Thompson"

Japanese CD single
 "Always Where I Need to Be"
 "Slave to the Game"
 "Something to Say"
 "Naïve" (live)

Charts

Weekly charts

Year-end charts

Certifications

In popular culture
"Always Where I Need to Be" features on the soundtrack to the video game by EA Sports, FIFA 09. This song is available in the PlayStation 3 Singstore, for the game Singstar. This song is also used as background music on ABC's commercials for Scrubs season eight premiering in 2009. The song has been featured several episodes of MTV Latin America Acapulco Shore.

References

2007 songs
2008 singles
The Kooks songs
Music videos directed by The Malloys
Song recordings produced by Tony Hoffer
Virgin Records singles